The attack on the on the Soviet naval presence or The Battle at the base of Vlora also known as the Vlora Incident, was an attack by Albania in the Mediterranean Sea against the Soviet Union. It ended with the withdrawal of the Soviets from the Albanian naval base. The incident was part of the Albanian-Soviet split.

Background and prelude (1945–1961)
After the end of World War II, Albania was considered a Soviet-friendly nation during Joseph Stalin's reign. Following his death in March 1953 and Nikita Khrushchev’s De-Stalinization and the execution of Lavrentiy Beria in December 1953, relations changed. In political circles, Albania came to be viewed with suspicion. Albania represented an obstacle in military waters as its grounded submarines prevented the USSR from gaining direct access to the Mediterranean.

In 1960-61, Enver Hoxha caused a rift with the Soviets after he aligned his military with China. Khrushchev hoped that Albanian would serve as a military base on the Mediterranean Sea for "all the socialist countries" and provided equipment and training to the Albanian army, which included a fleet of twelve submarines. The Soviet Union imposed economic sanctions on Albania, withdrew eight of the twelve submarines, broke up Soviet naval facilities at the Albanian port of Vlora, engaged in polemical exchanges with Albanian leadership and encouraged pro-Moscow leaders in Albanian to stage a coup against Hoxha. Among the conspiracy's controversial ringleaders was Vice Admiral Teme Sejko, a senior Albanian military officer. Although the U-boats' withdrawal came shortly after the announcement of a trial against Sejko, it should not be assumed that the Albanians had prompted the Soviets to withdraw.

The Soviet position in the Mediterranean
The Soviets followed in the footsteps of previous autocratic pursuers and were arguably more successful in their expansion of Russian Sea Fleet than their predecessors. However, this success was not achieved until after the First World War. Albania ceded part of the stirrup grip to the Soviet Union during its era leaps to the Mediterranean Sea. Comparatively insignificant politically and economically to the Soviet Union, Albania allowed the country to establish a strong military base that housed marines and larger units similar to destroyers.

The attack and withdrawal of Albania from the Warsaw Pact
Albanian officials who maintained the presence of the Soviet Navy outside the Mediterranean denounced the Brezhnev Doctrine of 1968 Qualified Sovereignty as a "social-imperialist policy of the Soviet government" and called for the immediate withdrawal of the Soviet Navy.

The Albanians then decided to use military force to steal four of the twelve Soviet submarines the Soviets withdrew and were able to take eight more with them. Following the Warsaw Pact invasion of Czechoslovakia in 1968, Albania withdrew from the Warsaw Pact.
 After the Soviets tried to leave Albania, they were pursued by the Albanian Naval Force and threatened with gunships. The Albanian Navy stated that if the Soviets tried anything they would be killed. During this crisis, a group of Soviets were killed and a Soviet ship was destroyed by the Albanian army.

Following these events, Khrushchev sought revenge on Albania. In 1962 he engaged with Warsaw Pact members on how they could launch an invasion of Albania. However, this plan failed because the Soviet Union had a conflict between the USA and NATO due to the Cuban crisis. Khrushchev also wanted to avoid such a military conflict with Albania because it would lead to a terrible war between Albania and the Soviet Union.

Aftermath
Following the withdrawal of Soviet troops from the Mediterranean naval base in the 1960s, the Albanians were able to successfully capture a number of Soviet submarines. After the attack in the 1970s, the Soviet Union lost access to the Mediterranean Sea on the Albanian coast.

References 

Battles involving Albania
Battles involving the Soviet Union
Cold War history of Albania